The 2014 E3 Harelbeke was the 57th running of the E3 Harelbeke single-day cycling race. The race was won by Peter Sagan in a four-man sprint finish.

Teams
As E3 Harelbeke was a UCI World Tour event, all 18 UCI ProTeams were invited automatically and obligated to send a squad. Seven other squads were given wildcard places, thus completing the 25-team peloton.

The 25 teams that competed in the race were:

Results

References

External links

E3 Harelbeke
E3 Harelbeke
E3 Harelbeke